Kirkstone Pass is a mountain pass in the English Lake District, in the county of Cumbria.

It is the District's highest pass traversed by road, the A592 road between Ambleside in Rothay Valley and Patterdale in Ullswater Valley. The road gradient approaches 1 in 4. The picturesque view down into Patterdale has Brothers Water as its focal point.

The Kirkstone Pass Inn stands close to the summit. Once a vital coaching inn, it now caters primarily for tourists. It is the third-highest public house in England.

Slate quarrying 

Lead and copper ore mining and slate mining has spanned centuries. 

Petts Quarry worked by Kirkstone Green Slate Company is just to the Ambleside side of the summit. Nearby is Hartsop Hall lead mine.

Caudale slate mine is a few miles further down, on the Ullswater side, and was last worked at the beginning of the 20th century; all its adits are now blocked.

Name 
The name of the pass comes from a prominent stone, the Kirkstone, which stands a few yards from the A592 on the Patterdale side of the inn. Its shadow resembles a steeple; 'kirk' means church in old Norse and was a variant in related Old English. 

In local names the climb from Ambleside is known as The Struggle.

Cultural references
In Cue For Treason, best-known novel of children's writer Geoffrey Trease, much of it set in Cumbria, the narrator's friend long uses the name "Kit Kirkstone", taken from the pass.

"Witch of the Westmorland" by musician Archie Fisher includes the lyric "weary by Ullswater, and the misty brake fern way, down through the cleft of the Kirkstone Pass, the winding water lay".

Gallery

See also
List of hill passes of the Lake District

Notes

References

External links

Roads in Cumbria
Mountain passes of the Lake District
Westmorland
Eden District